Live Sparks is a 1920 American silent comedy film directed by Ernest C. Warde and starring J. Warren Kerrigan, Mae Talbot, and Roy Laidlaw.

Cast
 J. Warren Kerrigan as Neil Sparks 
 Mae Talbot as Aunt Helen 
 Roy Laidlaw as Hiram Craig 
 Fritzi Brunette as Myrtle Pratt 
 Clyde Benson as William Carpenter 
 Beth Ivins as Bess Kinloch 
 Zelma Maja as Phyllis Gwynne 
 John Steppling as Jacob Abbott 
 Arthur Millett as Henry Lavigne 
 Joseph J. Dowling as David Pratt

References

Bibliography
 George A. Katchmer. Eighty Silent Film Stars: Biographies and Filmographies of the Obscure to the Well Known. McFarland, 1991.

External links

1920 films
1920 comedy films
Silent American comedy films
Films directed by Ernest C. Warde
American silent feature films
1920s English-language films
Pathé Exchange films
American black-and-white films
Films distributed by W. W. Hodkinson Corporation
1920s American films